Ancuța Bobocel (born 3 October 1987, in Drobeta-Turnu Severin) is a Romanian middle-distance runner who specializes in the 3000 metres steeplechase. She represented Romania at the 2008, 2012 and 2016 Summer Olympics and is a three-time participant at the World Championships in Athletics (2007, 2009 and 2013). In 2009, she won the European U23 and Jeux de la Francophonie steeplechase titles, as well as a silver at the Summer Universiade.

Career
Bobocel rose to prominence as a junior athlete competing in the steeplechase and in cross country running. She was the silver medallist in the steeplechase at the 2003 European Athletics Junior Championships, then repeated that finish at the 2004 World Junior Championships in Athletics. She was also the junior runner-up at the 2004 European Cross Country Championships that year. In 2005, she was twentieth in the junior race at the World Cross Country Championships and won the junior title at the 2005 European Cross Country Championships. She also retained her silver medal in the steeplechase at the 2005 European Athletics Junior Championships. She set a European junior record of 9:37.45 to take another steeplechase silver at the 2006 World Junior Championships in Athletics, but managed only third in the junior race at the 2006 European Cross Country Championships.

Her senior debut came over 3000 metres at the 2007 European Athletics Indoor Championships, where she was eleventh in the final. At the 2007 European Athletics U23 Championships she was runner-up to Katarzyna Kowalska, then represented Romania in the discipline at the 2007 World Championships in Athletics, being eliminated in the heats stage. The same fate beset her on her Olympic debut at the 2008 Beijing Olympics. She set a 3000 m best to finish eighth at the 2009 European Athletics Indoor Championships and reached the top of the podium in the steeplechase at the 2009 European Athletics U23 Championships. She was again eliminated in the heats of the 2009 World Championships in Athletics, but won medals at smaller competitions: she was the silver medallist behind Sara Moreira at the 2009 Summer Universiade and the gold medallist at the 2009 Jeux de la Francophonie.

Bobocel did not progress beyond the heats of the 3000 m at the 2010 IAAF World Indoor Championships, but was ninth in the final at the 2010 European Athletics Championships. She did not compete in the steeplechase in 2011, but instead entered the 1500 metres at the 2011 European Athletics Indoor Championships (although she was knocked out in the heats). She won the senior title at the 2012 World University Cross Country Championships and also led Romania to second in the team rankings.

Achievements

Personal bests
800 metres – 2:02.72 min (2008)
1500 metres – 4:13.20 min (2010)
1500 metres (indoor) – 4:08.13 min (2011)
3000 metres – 9:10.58 min (2007)
3000 metres (indoor) – 8:52.86 (2013)
3000 metres steeplechase – 9:25.70 (2012)

References

External links
 
 
 
 

1987 births
Living people
People from Drobeta-Turnu Severin
Romanian female long-distance runners
Romanian female steeplechase runners
Athletes (track and field) at the 2008 Summer Olympics
Athletes (track and field) at the 2012 Summer Olympics
Athletes (track and field) at the 2016 Summer Olympics
Olympic athletes of Romania
Universiade silver medalists in athletics (track and field)
Universiade silver medalists for Romania
Medalists at the 2009 Summer Universiade